Cho Yae-lee(Korean:조애리) (born ) is a South Korean female wheelchair curler.

Wheelchair curling teams and events

References

External links 

Living people
1984 births
South Korean female curlers
South Korean wheelchair curlers
Place of birth missing (living people)
21st-century South Korean women